Atiye Sultan ("gift"; 2 January 1824 – 11 August 1850) was an Ottoman princess, the daughter of Sultan Mahmud II and Pervizifelek Kadın. She was the half-sister of Sultans Abdulmejid I and Abdulaziz.

Early life
Atiye Sultan was born on 2 January 1824 in the Topkapı Palace. Her father was Sultan Mahmud II, son of Sultan Abdul Hamid I and Nakşidil Sultan, and her mother was Pervizfelek Kadın. She had two full sisters, Hatice Sultan, one year younger than her, and Fatma Sultan, four years younger than her, both died young.

She was described as a smart and talented girl, interested in poetry and literature. She was the closest half-sister to Abdülmejid I, who was only ten months older than her. Often, when they were young, she followed him out of the palace dressed as a boy.

Marriage
On 8 January 1840, during the reign of her elder half-brother Abdulmejid I, Atiye was betrothed to Rodosizade Ahmed Fethi Pasha. The marriage took place on 25 June 1840, and was performed by Shaykh al-Islām Mekkizade Mustafa Asım Efendi with a dowry of 1001 silver purses. The wedding took place on 7 August 1840 in the Dolmabahçe Palace and lasted for seven days. Atiye was sixteen and Ahmed Fethi was thirty nine years old at the time. The groom was in his second marriage and already had two children, Mehmed Besim Bey and Mahmud Celaeddin Paşah, who married Cemile Sultan, daughter of Abdülmecid; and three daughters, Ferdane Hanım, Saliha Yeğane Hanım and Emine Güzide Hanım. 

The couple were given the Arnavutköyü Palace as their residence. After that, she lived in the Kuruçeşme Palace, Esma Sultan Palace and Eyüphan Villa located in Kağıthane, between Eyüp and Defterdar. After the marriage the pasha moved to Atiye's palace. When she later learned that he was married, she displayed great jealousy and insisted on his not leaving the palace. Even in the evenings when didn't return to the palace because of his affairs, she would send men to his previous mansion in Kuzguncuk and checked if he was there.

The two together had two daughters, Seniye Hanımsultan, born on 4 October 1843, and Feride Hanımsultan, born on 30 April 1847. Charles White, who visited Istanbul in 1843, said following about her:

Death
Atiye Sultan died on 11 August 1850 at the age of twenty-six, and was buried in the mausoleum of her father located in Divanyolu, Istanbul.

Issue

Ancestry

See also
 List of Ottoman princesses

References

Sources

1824 births
1850 deaths
19th-century Ottoman princesses
Royalty from Istanbul